Prince Ismail Imaduddeen was born on October 11, 1915 in Cairo, Egypt to Sultan Muhammad Imaaduddeen VI and Queen Umm Kulthum Didi. He graduated from Al-Azhar University as a scholar in Islamic studies. His hobbies included the love for music, especially instruments like the piano and Oud.

He spoke fluent Divehi, Urdu, Arabic and English. He married Princess Sameera Ali Abu El'la from Egypt in 1944 and had a son (Al Nabeel Ahmed Ismail Imaduddeen) and a daughter (Al Nabeelah Azeeza Ismail Imaduddeen) with her.

He later left with his family to Maldives on January 18, 1960. He died on September, 1972 in Male', Maldives.

1915 births
1972 deaths
Al-Azhar University alumni
Egyptian emigrants
Immigrants to the Maldives

dv:ސުލްޠާން މުޙައްމަދު ޢިމާދުއްދީނު (ހަވަނަ)